Ingrid Mierzwiak (born 23 January 1953) is a German volleyball player. She competed in the women's tournament at the 1976 Summer Olympics.

References

External links
 

1953 births
Living people
German women's volleyball players
Olympic volleyball players of East Germany
Volleyball players at the 1976 Summer Olympics
Sportspeople from Prenzlau